In 1890, the Jewish population of Oklahoma Territory was estimated to be about 100 people. By statehood in 1907, that number grew to about 1,000. The peak of Oklahoma Jewish population occurred in the 1920s with a total population of about 7,500. In 2003, 2,300 Jews resided in Oklahoma City and 2,600 in Tulsa. Reform, Conservative, and Chabad congregations serve both of these communities. In 1916 there were seven small-town congregations including Enid, Hartshorne, and Chickasha. This number has dwindled to three Reform congregations located in Muskogee, Ponca City, and Seminole, with congregational membership between fourteen and twenty-two people.

Notable Oklahoma Jews have included Oklahoma Secretary of Health and state senator Tom Adelson; historian Daniel J. Boorstin; Oklahoma State Treasurer Robert Butkin; Oklahoma City School Board and Chamber of Commerce president Seymor C. Heyman; businessman and philanthropist George Kaiser; financier Henry Kravis; actor and filmmaker Tim Blake Nelson; actor Tony Randall; and Alexander Sondheimer, Oklahoma's first court reporter. The philanthropy of Charles and Lynn Schusterman has helped to establish Tulsa's Jewish Community Center, the Judaic Studies program at the University of Oklahoma, the Center for Jewish Studies at the University of Texas, and the Israel studies program at Brandeis University

This is a list of Oklahoma synagogues.

Other Jewish Organizations in Oklahoma

Gallery

See also
Oldest Synagogues in the United States, Temple Emeth

References

 
Synagogues
Oklahoma
Synagogues